VfR Baumholder is a German association football club from the town of Baumholder, Rhineland-Palatinate. The team played as a second and third division side through most of the 1950s, 1960s, and on into the early 1970s.



History
The club was established sometime in 1921 as Verein für Rasensport Baumholder and in 1937 merged with Turnverein 1886 Baumholder and Athletenverein Baumholder to form Verein für Leibesübungen Baumholder. The club was renamed VfR in 1946.

VfR first appeared in the second division Amateurliga Rheinhessen/Nahe in the 1951–52 season. From 1955–63 they were part of the Amateurliga Südwest (II) where their best result was a second-place finish in 1959.

The club was relegated in 1961, but quickly made its way back to Amateurliga play which had become a third division circuit after the formation of the Bundesliga (I) in 1963. The club currently plays in Landesliga West (VII) after promotion from the Bezirksliga Nahe (VIII) in 2014.

References

External links
Official team site
Das deutsche Fußball-Archiv historical German domestic league tables 

Football clubs in Germany
Football clubs in Rhineland-Palatinate
1921 establishments in Germany
Association football clubs established in 1921